Kazan is the capital city of the Republic of Tatarstan, Russia.

Kazan may also refer to:

Places
Kazan, Ankara, former name of Kahramankazan, a suburb and a metropolitan district of Ankara, Turkey
Kazan River, a river in the Kivalliq Region of Nunavut, Canada
Kazan Region, a physiographic province of Canada
Kazan Urban Okrug, a municipal formation into which the city of republic significance of Kazan in the Republic of Tatarstan, Russia is incorporated

Great Kazan and Small Kazan gorges, part of the Iron Gates gorge of the Danube River
Old Kazan or İske Qazan, a historic town in modern-day Tatarstan
Kazan Wildland Park, a provincial park in Alberta, Canada
Kāsān, alternative name of the village of Kesar in Gilan Province, Iran
Kazan-retto, a Japanese island group aka the Volcano Islands

Airports
Kazan International Airport, southeast of Kazan
Kazan-2 Airport, older airfield now in the northeastern part of the city
Kazan-Borisoglebskoye or Borisoglebskoye Airfield, an experimental airfield north of the city

Arts, entertainment, and media
Kazan (1921 film), a lost silent film
Kazan (1949 film), an American drama film
Kazan (novel), a 1914 book by James Oliver Curwood

Kazan (manga), a manga by Gaku Miyao
Kazan, a character in the 1997 movie Cube

Historical formations
Khanate of Kazan (1438–1552), a medieval state in Europe
Kazan Governorate (1708–1920), a division of the Tsardom of Russia, the Russian Empire, and the early Russian SFSR
Kazan Principality, a principality within Volga Bulgaria and the Golden Horde

People
Emperor Kazan (968–1008), Japanese emperor
Abraham E. Kazan (1889–1971), American trade union activist
Elia Kazan (1909–2003), American theatre and film director
Frances Kazan, English-born author
Lainie Kazan (born 1940), American actress
Molly Kazan (1906–1963), American dramatist and playwright
Nicholas Kazan (born 1945), American writer, producer, and director
Rabia Kazan (born 1976), Turkish journalist
Vangelis Kazan (1936/1938–2008), Greek character actor
Watanabe Kazan (1793–1841), Japanese politician and painter
Zoe Kazan (born 1983), American actress and playwright

Other uses
Our Lady of Kazan, Orthodox icon of the Theotokos
Kazan (cookware), a type of large cooking pot
FC Rubin Kazan, a Russian football club based in the city of Kazan, Tatarstan republic
Russian submarine Kazan (K-561)
Kazan Helicopters, a Russian helicopter design bureau and manufacturer
, a Hansa A Type cargo ship in service 1946-73

See also
Kazanka (disambiguation)
Kazansky (disambiguation)
Kazan Cathedral (disambiguation)
Kazon, fictional race in the Star Trek universe
Qazan (disambiguation)
Gazan (disambiguation)
Ghazan (1271–1304), 13th century Mongol leader of the Ilkhanate
Karzan (disambiguation)